The Fourteenth East Asia Summit was held in Bangkok, Thailand on November 4, 2019. The East Asia Summit is an annual meeting of national leaders from the East Asian region and adjoining countries. EAS has evolved as forum for strategic dialogue and cooperation on political, security and economic issues of common regional concern and plays an important role in the regional architecture.

Attending delegations
The heads of state and heads of government of the eighteen countries participated in the summit. The host of the 2019 East Asian Summit is also the Chairperson of ASEAN, the Prime Minister of Thailand, Prayut Chan-o-cha.

American delegation to the summit was reduced compared to previous years, with Secretary of Commerce Wilbur Ross being the most senior official in the delegation, and National Security Advisor Robert O' Brien heading the delegation.

Gallery

References

2019 conferences
2019 in international relations
21st-century diplomatic conferences (Asia-Pacific)
ASEAN meetings
2019 in Thailand